Yoichi may refer to:

Yōichi, Japanese given name
, district in Shiribeshi, Hokkaidō Prefecture, Japan
, town in Yoichi District
, a Japanese whisky distillery in the town
, train station in Yoichi District
 also Yoichi is a masculine Japanese given name.
 , Japanese engineer
, Japanese actor
 , famous Japanese samurai archer
, Japanese actor

Japanese masculine given names